Buffalo Public School No. 24, also known as Public School 59, is a historic school building located in the Broadway-Fillmore neighborhood of Buffalo, Erie County, New York. The original section was built in 1901, and is a three-story, seven bay, "I"-shaped, red brick building over a raised basement with Renaissance Revival detailing. The building incorporates sandstone, terra cotta, and pressed metal details.  It was the first school to offer special education within the City of Buffalo school system. The school has been redeveloped as an apartment building.

It was listed on the National Register of Historic Places in 2016.

References

External links

Buffalo as an Architectural Museum: Public School 59

School buildings on the National Register of Historic Places in New York (state)
Renaissance Revival architecture in New York (state)
School buildings completed in 1901
Buildings and structures in Buffalo, New York
National Register of Historic Places in Buffalo, New York
1901 establishments in New York (state)